Smilax aculeatissima is a species of flowering plants known only from the State of Queensland in northeastern Australia.

References

External links

Smilacaceae
Flora of Queensland
Plants described in 1986